The Kabale–Lake Bunyonyi Road is a road in Uganda, connecting the town of Kabale to Lake Bunyonyi, reported to be the second-deepest lake in the world.

Location
From there, the road travels in a general south-westerly direction to the shores of Lake Bunyonyi, a distance of approximately

Overview
Lake Bunyonyi is an important tourist attraction in Uganda, due to its remote location, cool climate and the absence of crocodiles, hippopotami, bilharzia parasites and scarcity of malaria-carrying mosquitoes.

The road is used by tourists and residents who live on the more than 25 islands on the lake. Prior to 2019, the road leading from Kabale to the lake was gravel-surfaced. The government of Uganda intends to improve the road to class II bitumen surface, with culverts and drainage channels. Other road infrastructure around the lake is being developed to attract more tourists.

Upgrade and funding
In March 2019, the Ugandan junior minister of finance announced that government had secured US$18 million to upgrade the Kabale-Lake Bunyonyi Road to class II bitumen surface and to procure a marine ferry to transport tourists and residents across the lake. At that time, the procurement process for a contractor for the road and a supplier for the ferry were ongoing.

In December 2020, the African Development Fund (ADF), approved a loan of US$71.5 million, as 86 percent funding for the improvement of this road and the Kisoro-Mgahinga Park Gates Road. The total road distance to be upgraded measures . Other related infrastructure developments under the same loan include the construction of two roadside markets and construction of four ferry landing sites on Lake Bunyonyi. The government of Uganda will contribute US$11.9 million as its 14 percent equity funding towards this development.

See also
 List of roads in Uganda
 Kisoro
 Kyanika

References

External links
 Webpage of the East African Community

Roads in Uganda
Geography of Uganda
Transport in Uganda
Kabale District
Western Region, Uganda